Caherconree at , is the 20th–highest peak in Ireland on the Arderin scale, and the 27th–highest peak on the Vandeleur-Lynam scale.  Caherconree is the 2nd-highest mountain in the Slieve Mish Mountains in the Dingle Peninsula in Kerry, Ireland, and one of its southerly spurs is the site of an ancient stone promontory fort, which is a protected National Monument.

Naming 
In Irish academic Paul Tempan's Irish Hills and Mountain Names, the name derives from Cú Roí mac Daire, the legendary king of Munster who features in many Irish folklore tales including those concerning Cú Chulainn and Bláthnat.

Geography
Caherconree is the 2nd-highest mountain of the Slieve Mish range, which is situated at the eastern-end of the Dingle Peninsula, in Kerry.  Caherconree is part of a "horseshoe" of the largest peaks in the Slieve Mish range that bound the deep glaciated valled of the Derrymore Glen, that include the mountains of Gerahane , and Baurtregaum , the highest peak in the range.

Caherconree's prominence of  does not qualify it as a Marilyn, however, it ranks it as the 11th-highest mountain in Ireland on the MountainViews Online Database, 100 Highest Irish Mountains, where the minimum prominence threshold is 100 metres.

Hill walking

The easiest route is the 4-kilometre 2-hour return trip from the Bóthar na gCloch road (a north-south road between the N86 and the R561 roads); from where an easterly Caherconree Fort Trail goes from the car-park to the ancient promontory fort, from which the summit of Caherconree can be easily accessed.  

A popular method of climbing Caherconree is via is the Derrymore Glen Horseshoe, a 11-kilometre 5-hour loop that starts from the base of the Derrymore Glen and ascends to the first summit of Gearhane, and then around the "horseshoe" to Caherconree and the summit of Baurtregaum.  Options for the descent use either the Baurtregaum NW Top spur or the Baurtregaum NE Top Spur (and the Scragg) to get back to the base of the Glen.  The route is recommended for its views of the Glen as well as incorporating most of the main peaks of the Slieve Mish range, and is also called The Slieve Mish Circuit in some guidebooks.

Caherconree Promontory Fort
The fort is surrounded on three sides by steep cliffs. In Irish mythology this is the fort of Cú Roí mac Dáire, who was able to make it spin around at night to stop attackers finding the entrance. 

In the story of Aided Con Roí, a king's daughter called Bláthnat is taken against her will to the fort by Cú Roí. She is rescued by her lover, Cú Chulainn, to whom she signals that the time will be right to attack when she pours milk into a nearby stream; Bláthnat created the opportunity by taunting Cú Roí that his fort was too
small for such a magnificent chieftain thus compelling him to take down the walls to build a bigger fort. This stream is now called the Finglas (from an Fhionnghlaise meaning "the white stream") and its source is close to the remains of the ringfort.

Between the summits of Caherconree and Gearhane, is a rock feature called Fin MacCool's Chair, named after the mythical figure Fionn mac Cumhaill.

Gallery

See also

List of mountains in Ireland
Lists of mountains and hills in the British Isles 
List of Hewitt mountains in England, Wales and Ireland

References

External links
MountainViews: The Irish Mountain Website, Caherconree 
MountainViews: Irish Online Mountain Database
The Database of British and Irish Hills , the largest database of British Isles mountains ("DoBIH")
Hill Bagging UK & Ireland, the searchable interface for the DoBIH

Hewitts of Ireland
Mountains and hills of County Kerry
Forts in the Republic of Ireland
Mountains under 1000 metres
National Monuments in County Kerry